Celebrity Duets is an American reality television show, of the progressive game-show type, which combined celebrities of different backgrounds with professional singers in a weekly elimination competition.

History
The show was a take-off of the Australian series program It Takes Two and its predecessor, the BBC's Just the Two of Us; however, unlike the British and Australian shows, the celebrities sang with different partners each week. Indeed, Celebrity Duets was meant to be transmitted in the UK first, under the title Star Duets. But the BBC bought the format before Simon Cowell got to produce it on ITV. There was even court action, which the BBC won. Thus, Star Duets never came into production.

Transmissions
The show debuted on Fox, with a 2-hour premiere installment on August 29, 2006. It then moved to its normal Thursday timeslot the following week, and stayed there until its season finale on September 29, 2006.

Associated personnel
Simon Cowell of American Idol and The X Factor fame created the program, and Wayne Brady of Whose Line Is It Anyway? fame, himself a singer and the former host of a variety show on ABC, hosted the show. The judges were renowned composer and producer David Foster, rock and roll pioneer Little Richard, and singer Marie Osmond.

Contestants

Results summary

Duet partners
 Michael Bolton
 Boyz II Men
 Chaka Khan
 Jesse McCartney
 Clint Black
 Smokey Robinson
 Dionne Warwick
 Gladys Knight
 Brian McKnight
 Patti LaBelle
 Kenny Loggins
 Richard Marx
 Randy Travis
 Belinda Carlisle
 Peter Frampton
 Taylor Dayne
 Aaron Neville
 Lee Ann Womack
 James Ingram
 Wynonna Judd
 Michelle Williams
 Jeffrey Osborne
 Anita Pointer
 Toby Keith
 Dennis DeYoung, formerly of Styx
 Deniece Williams
 Dee Snider, of Twisted Sister
 Al Jarreau
 Sebastian Bach, formerly of Skid Row
 Bonnie Tyler

Duet partners by contestant
 Alfonso Ribeiro - Michelle Williams, James Ingram, Jeffrey Osborne, Deniece Williams, Chaka Khan, Jon Secada, Gladys Knight
 Lucy Lawless - Michael Bolton, Smokey Robinson, Kenny Loggins, Dionne Warwick, Richard Marx, Bonnie Tyler
 Hal Sparks - Smokey Robinson, Gladys Knight, Wynonna Judd, Dennis DeYoung, Dee Snider, Sebastian Bach
 Jai Rodriguez - Gladys Knight, Michelle Williams, Brian McKnight, Taylor Dayne, Patti LaBelle
 Cheech Marin - Peter Frampton, Randy Travis, Clint Black, Aaron Neville, Al Jarreau
 Carly Patterson - James Ingram, Lee Ann Womack, Anita Pointer, Jesse McCartney
 Lea Thompson - Randy Travis, Michael Bolton, Belinda Carlisle
 Chris Jericho - Lee Ann Womack, Peter Frampton

Judges
 David Foster
 Little Richard
 Marie Osmond

Host
 Wayne Brady

Ratings
For the season, the series averaged 3.8 million viewers, making it the lowest-rated Fox series of the entire season, and indeed one of the lowest-rated programs on any network for the season that year. This ratings failure precluded any production of a second season.

International versions
 Currently airing franchise
 Franchise no longer in production

References

External links
 

Fox Broadcasting Company original programming
Singing talent shows
Celebrity competitions
2000s American music television series
2000s American reality television series
2006 American television series debuts
2006 American television series endings
Television series by 20th Century Fox Television